The Vickers Varsity is a retired British twin-engined crew trainer operated by the Royal Air Force from 1951 to 1976.

Design and development

The Varsity was developed by Vickers and based on the Viking and Valetta to meet Air Ministry Specification T.13/48 for a twin-engined training aircraft to replace the Wellington T10 and the Valetta T3 and T4. The main differences were the wider-span wings, longer fuselage and tricycle undercarriage. There was also a ventral pannier to allow a trainee bomb aimer to lie in a prone position and a bomb bay with a capacity for 24 x 25lb smoke & flash bombs.
The first prototype Type 668 Varsity VX828 was first flown by J 'Mutt' Summers and G R 'Jock' Bryce from Wisley on 17 July 1949.

A civil version the VC.3 was planned but with the success of the VC.2 Viscount the idea was abandoned.

Operational history

The Varsity was introduced to replace the Wellington T10 trainer. Following deliveries to trials units the first production aircraft were delivered for operational use in 1951 to No. 201 Advanced Flying School at RAF Swinderby, where they were used to train pilots to fly multi-engined aircraft. It also equipped two Air Navigator Schools in 1952, and the Bomber Command Bombing school, with the job of training crews for RAF Bomber-Command's V-bomber crews.

The Swedish Air Force operated a single Varsity from January 1953 to 1973 mainly for electronic intelligence missions. The Swedish military designation was Tp 82.

The Varsity was withdrawn from service with the RAF in May 1976, its role as a pilot trainer being taken over by the Scottish Aviation Jetstream T1, and as a navigation trainer by the Hawker Siddeley Dominie T1.

The last flying example (Serial WL679) was operated by the Royal Aircraft Establishment; it was retired into preservation at the RAF Museum in 1992.

Operators

 
 Royal Jordanian Air Force
 
 Swedish Air Force
 
 Aeroplane and Armament Experimental Establishment
 Royal Air Force
 No. 51 Squadron RAF
 No. 97 Squadron RAF
 No. 115 Squadron RAF
 No. 116 Squadron RAF
 No. 151 Squadron RAF
 No. 173 Squadron RAF
 No. 187 Squadron RAF
 No. 192 Squadron RAF
 No. 204 Squadron RAF
 No. 527 Squadron RAF
 Bomber Command Bombing School RAF
 Central Navigation and Control School
 Royal Air Force College Cranwell
 Central Flying School
 No. 4 Flying Training School RAF
 No. 5 Flying Training School RAF
 No. 6 Flying Training School RAF
 No. 201 Advanced Flying School RAF later named No. 11 Flying Training School RAF
 No. 1 Air Navigation School RAF
 No. 2 Air Navigation School RAF
 No. 3 Air Navigation School RAF
 No. 6 Air Navigation School RAF
 No. 1 Air Electronics School RAF
 No. 1 Radio School RAF
 Royal Aircraft Establishment
 Empire Test Pilot's School

Aircraft on display

Germany
 WF382 – Varsity T.1 in storage at Berlin-Tegel Airport for the Allied Museum in Berlin.

Sweden
 82001 – Tp 82 on static display at the Swedish Air Force Museum in Linköping, Östergötland.

United Kingdom
 WF369 – Varsity T.1 on static display at the Newark Air Museum in Newark, Nottinghamshire.
 WF372 – Varsity T.1 on static display at the Brooklands Museum in Weybridge, Surrey.
 WJ903 – Varsity T.1 nose section on static display at Aeroventure in Doncaster, South Yorkshire.
 WJ945 – Varsity T.1 on static display at the Classic Air Force in Newquay, Cornwall.
 WL626 – Varsity T.1 on static display at the East Midlands Airport Aeropark in Castle Donington, Leicestershire.
 WL679 – Varsity T.1 on static display at the Royal Air Force Museum Cosford in Cosford, Shropshire.

Specifications (T Mk 1)

See also

References

Notes

Bibliography
 Andrews, C.F. and E.B. Morgan. Vickers Aircraft since 1908. London: Putnam, 1988. .
 Bagshaw, R. Deacon, R. Pollock, A. and Thomas, M. RAF Little Rissington: The Central Flying School years 1946 - 1976. Pen & Sword, 2006 
 Ellis, Ken. Wrecks & Relics.  Manchester, UK: Crécy Publishing, 21st edition, 2008. .

 Martin, Bernard. The Viking, Valetta and Varsity. Tonbridge, Kent, UK:  Air-Britain (Historians) Ltd., 1975. .
 Rawlings, J.D.R. "Vickers Varsity". Air Pictorial,  Vol. 33, No. 5, May 1971, pp. 172–176.
 Thetford, Owen. Aircraft of the Royal Aircraft 1918–57. London: Putnam, 1st edition, 1957.

External links

 "Aircrew Trainer," Flight, 30 March 1950, pp. 406–410

1950s British military trainer aircraft
Varsity
Mid-wing aircraft
Aircraft first flown in 1949
Twin piston-engined tractor aircraft